Si Sakhon is a district (amphoe) of Narathiwat province, southern Thailand.

History
Originally Tambon Sa Ko was a part of the Rueso district, but the development division of the Thai military settled in the area from 1963–1974, thus developing the infrastructure of Tambon Sa Ko. The interior ministry subsequently created Si Sakhon Minor District (king amphoe) consisting of the two tambons, Sako and Tamayung, on 23 September 1974. It was upgraded to a full district on 25 March 1979.

Etymology
The name Si Sakhon refers to the Sai Buri River, which flows through the middle of the district.

Geography
Neighboring districts are (from the north clockwise): Rueso, Ra-ngae, and Chanae of Narathiwat Province; Than To and Bannang Sata of Yala province.

Administration
The district is divided into six sub-districts (tambons), which are further subdivided into 39 villages (mubans). The township (thesaban tambon) Si Sakhon covers parts of tambons Si Sakhon and Sa Ko. There are a further six tambon administrative organizations (TAO).

References

External links
amphoe.com

Districts of Narathiwat province